"Fences" is a song by Belgian singer and songwriter Blanche. It was released as a digital download on 27 March 2020 by PIAS Belgium as the second single from her debut studio album Empire.

Background
She announced the release of her new single on her Instagram account, she said, "Hey, I'm happy to announce that my my new single 'Fences' will be out on March 27. It is the fourth track of my album 'Empire' to be out April 24! Stay tuned."

Critical reception
Jonathan Vautrey of Wiwibloggs said, "'Fences' sees Blanche turn the BPM up a bit and is perhaps her most danceable track to date (at least in the chorus). But, it's still well within her moody-pop repertoire. A drum beat underlines the song, while electronic instrumentation is added into the chorus to create dynamism."

Charts

Release history

Notes

References

2020 songs
2020 singles
Blanche (singer) songs
Songs written by Blanche (singer)